Gulia Tutberidze Stadium is a multi-use stadium in Zugdidi, Georgia. 

Sports venues in Georgia (country)
Football venues in Georgia (country)
Buildings and structures in Samegrelo-Zemo Svaneti